Hüttenkopf is the name of following mountains and mountain peaks:
in Germany:
Mindelheimer Köpfl (Hüttenkopf; 2180 m), in the Allgäu Alps, Bavaria
Hüttenkopf (Allgäu Alps) (1949 m), in the Höfats and Rauheck Group, Allgäu Alps, Bavaria
Hüttenkopf (Daumen Group) (1942 m), in the Daumen Group, Allgäu Alps, Bavaria
Hüttenkopf (Rothaar Mountains) (689.9 m), in the Rothaar Mountains, Hesse
Hüttenkopf (Harz) (597.2 m), in Harz, Lower Saxony
Monzeler Hüttenkopf (423.4 m), in the Moselle Hills, Rhineland-Palatinate
in Austria:
Hüttenkopf (Venediger Group) (2614 m), in the Venediger Group, Salzburg
Hüttenkopf (Kitzbühel Alps) (2462 m), in the Kitzbühel Alps, Tyrol
Hüttenkopf (Steinkogel) (2180 m), in the Kitzbühel Alps, Salzburg
Hüttenkopf (Bregenz Forest Mountains) (1976 m), in the Bregenz Forest Mountains, Vorarlberg
Hüttenkopf (Hochvogel Group) (1701 m), in the Hochvogel and Rosszahn Group, Allgäu Alps, Tyrol